Trepte is a surname. Notable people with the surname include:

Ludwig Trepte (born 1988), German actor
Uli Trepte (1941–2009), German musician